Richard Schwarz (January 8, 1890 – January 20, 1942) was a track and field athlete who competed for the Russian Empire in the 1912 Summer Olympics. He was born in Pawlowsa, Russian Empire. In 1912 he was eliminated in the first round of the 100 metres competition.

References

External links
list of German athletes

1890 births
1942 deaths
Male sprinters from the Russian Empire
Olympic competitors for the Russian Empire
Athletes (track and field) at the 1912 Summer Olympics